Reginald John Mickel (born August 1953) is an Australian politician.  He was the Speaker of the Legislative Assembly of Queensland and the Labor member for Logan until the 2012 election. He was succeeded by Fiona Simpson as Speaker, as he did not contest the 2012 election.

Early life
Born in Murgon, Queensland, he went to school at St Laurence's College and later attended the University of Queensland where he studied literature and education.

Political career
In 1979, he joined the Labor Party and was an adviser to federal MP David Beddall. He was later a senior adviser to Queensland Premier Wayne Goss and to Health Minister (later Premier) Peter Beattie.

In 1998, he was elected to the Legislative Assembly of Queensland as the Labor member for Logan. He was a minister in various portfolios from 2004 to 2009. He served in Beattie's initial Cabinet as Environment Minister in 2004, but was transferred to Energy in August of that year. In March 2005, he added the Aboriginal and Torres Strait Islanders Policy portfolio. In September 2006, he became Minister for State Development, Industrial Relations and Employment. When Anna Bligh replaced Beattie as Premier, Mickel's portfolio was altered, becoming Transport, Trade, Employment and Industrial Relations. He was dropped from the ministry after Labor's re-election in the 2009 state election, but was elected Speaker when the Legislative Assembly convened in April 2009.

Mickel announced on 10 August 2011 that he would step down at the 2012 election.

Family life
Mickel is married; he has three children.

References

1953 births
Living people
Members of the Queensland Legislative Assembly
Speakers of the Queensland Legislative Assembly
University of Queensland alumni
Australian Labor Party members of the Parliament of Queensland
21st-century Australian politicians